Stanislav Binar (8 August 1908 – 20 March 1969) was a Czech sculptor. His work was part of the sculpture event in the art competition at the 1948 Summer Olympics.

References

1908 births
1969 deaths
20th-century Czech sculptors
20th-century Czech male artists
Czech male sculptors
Olympic competitors in art competitions
Artists from Brno